Dediapada is one of the 182 Legislative Assembly constituencies of Gujarat state in India. It is part of Narmada district and is reserved for candidates belonging to the Scheduled Tribes.

List of segments
This assembly seat represents the following segments,

 Dediapada Taluka
 Sagbara Taluka

Members of Legislative Assembly

Election results

2022

2017

2012

2007

2002

See also
 List of constituencies of the Gujarat Legislative Assembly
 Narmada district

References

External links
 

Assembly constituencies of Gujarat
Narmada district